Calycophyllum is a genus of flowering plants in the family Rubiaceae. It was described by Augustin Pyramus de Candolle in 1830. The genus is found from Mexico, Central America, South America and the West Indies.

Species 
 Calycophyllum candidissimum (Vahl) DC. common names: lemonwood, digame lancewood  - Mexico (Campeche, Chiapas, Oaxaca, Veracruz), Belize, Central America, Cuba, Trinidad, Venezuela, Colombia 
 Calycophyllum intonsum Steyerm. - Venezuela, Guyana, Brazil
 Calycophyllum megistocaulum (K.Krause) C.M.Taylor - Bolivia, Colombia, Ecuador, Peru, Brazil 
 Calycophyllum merumense Steyerm. - Guyana
 Calycophyllum multiflorum Griseb. - Bolivia, Brazil, Argentina, Paraguay 
 Calycophyllum obovatum (Ducke) Ducke - Guyana, Venezuela, Colombia, Brazil 
 Calycophyllum papillosum J.H.Kirkbr. - Brazil (Espírito Santo)
 Calycophyllum spectabile Steyerm. - Guyana
 Calycophyllum spruceanum (Benth.) Hook.f. ex K.Schum. - Bolivia, Colombia, Ecuador, Peru, Brazil 
 Calycophyllum tefense J.H.Kirkbr. - Brazil (Amazonas)
 Calycophyllum venezuelense Steyerm. - Venezuela, Guyana

References

External links 
 
 
 Calycophyllum in the World Checklist of Rubiaceae

Rubiaceae genera
Dialypetalantheae
Flora of Central America
Flora of South America